Rice Ridge is a low ridge with rocky exposures, 1 nautical mile (1.9 km) long, which extends from the north side of Anderson Dome in the Jones Mountains. Mapped by the university of Minnesota-Jones Mountains Party, 1960–61. Named by Advisory Committee on Antarctic Names (US-ACAN) for Lieutenant Commander Robert A. Rice, U.S. Navy, Supply and Fiscal Officer of Mobile Construction Battalion One on U.S. Navy Operation Deepfreeze 1962.
 

Ridges of Ellsworth Land